S transform as a time–frequency distribution was developed in 1994 for analyzing geophysics data. In this way, the S transform is a generalization of the short-time Fourier transform (STFT), extending the continuous wavelet transform and overcoming some of its disadvantages. For one, modulation sinusoids are fixed with respect to the time axis; this localizes the scalable Gaussian window dilations and translations in S transform. Moreover, the S transform doesn't have a cross-term problem and yields a better signal clarity than Gabor transform. However, the S transform has its own disadvantages: the clarity is worse than Wigner distribution function and Cohen's class distribution function.

A fast S transform algorithm was invented in 2010. It reduces the computational complexity from O[N2·log(N)] to O[N·log(N)] and makes the transform one-to-one, where the transform has the same number of points as the source signal or image, compared to storage complexity of N2 for the original formulation. An implementation is available to the research community under an open source license.

A general formulation of the S transform makes clear the relationship to other time frequency transforms such as the Fourier, short time Fourier, and wavelet transforms.

Definition
There are several ways to represent the idea of the S transform. In here, S transform is derived as the phase correction of the continuous wavelet transform with window being the Gaussian function.
S-Transform

Inverse S-Transform

Modified form
Spectrum Form
Applying the Fourier transform to both  and  gives
.
Discrete-time S-transform
From the spectrum form of S-transform, we can derive the discrete-time S-transform. 
The Discrete time S-transform can then be expressed as:

Implementation of discrete-time S-transform
Below is the Pseudo code of the implementation.
   Step1.Compute  
   loop over m (voices){
      Step2.Compute for 
      Step3.Move  to 
      Step4.Multiply Step2 and Step3 
      Step5.IDFT().
   Repeat.}

Comparison with other time–frequency analysis tools

Comparison with Gabor transform
The only difference between the Gabor transform (GT) and the S transform is the window size. For GT, the windows size is a Gaussian function , meanwhile, the window function for S-Transform is a function of f.
With a window function proportional to frequency, S Transform performs well in frequency domain analysis when the input frequency is low. When the input frequency is high, S-Transform has a better clarity in the time domain. As table below. 
  
This kind of property makes S-Transform a powerful tool to analyze sound because human is sensitive to low frequency part in a sound signal.

Comparison with Wigner transform
The main problem with the Wigner Transform is the cross term, which stems from the auto-correlation function in the Wigner Transform function. This cross term may cause noise and distortions in signal analyses. S-transform analyses avoid this issue.

Comparison with the short-time Fourier transform 
We can compare the S transform and short-time Fourier transform (STFT). First, a high frequency signal, a low frequency signal, and a high frequency burst signal are used in the experiment to compare the performance. The S transform characteristic of frequency dependent resolution allows the detection of the high frequency burst. On the other hand, as the STFT consists of a constant window width, it leads to the result having poorer definition. In the second experiment, two more high frequency bursts are added to crossed chirps. In the result, all four frequencies were detected by the S transform. On the other hand, the two high frequencies bursts are not detected by STFT. The high frequencies bursts cross term caused STFT to have a single frequency at lower frequency.

Applications
 Signal filterings
 Magnetic resonance imaging (MRI)
 Power system disturbance recognition
 S transform has been proven to be able to identify a few types of disturbances, like voltage sag, voltage swell, momentary interruption, and oscillatory transients.
 S transform also be applied for other types of disturbances such as notches, harmonics with sag and swells etc.
 S transform generates contours which are suitable for simple visual inspection. However, wavelet transform requires specific tools like standard multiresolution analysis.
 Geophysical signal analysis
 Reflection seismology
 Global seismology

See also
 Laplace transform
 Wavelet transform
 Short-time Fourier transform

References

 Rocco Ditommaso, Felice Carlo Ponzo, Gianluca Auletta (2015). Damage detection on framed structures: modal curvature evaluation using Stockwell Transform under seismic excitation. Earthquake Engineering and Engineering Vibration. June 2015, Volume 14, Issue 2, pp 265–274.
 Rocco Ditommaso, Marco Mucciarelli, Felice C. Ponzo (2010). S-Transform based filter applied to the analysis of non-linear dynamic behaviour of soil and buildings. 14th European Conference on Earthquake Engineering. Proceedings Volume. Ohrid, Republic of Macedonia. August 30 – September 3, 2010. (downloadable from http://roccoditommaso.xoom.it)
 M. Mucciarelli, M. Bianca, R. Ditommaso, M.R. Gallipoli, A. Masi, C Milkereit, S. Parolai, M. Picozzi, M. Vona (2011). FAR FIELD DAMAGE ON RC BUILDINGS: THE CASE STUDY OF NAVELLI DURING THE L’AQUILA (ITALY) SEISMIC SEQUENCE, 2009. Bulletin of Earthquake Engineering. .
 J. J. Ding, "Time-frequency analysis and wavelet transform course note," the Department of Electrical Engineering, National Taiwan University (NTU), Taipei, Taiwan, 2007.
 Jaya Bharata Reddy, Dusmanta Kumar Mohanta, and B. M. Karan, "Power system disturbance recognition using wavelet and s-transform techniques," Birla institute of Technology, Mesra, Ranchi-835215, 2004.
 B. Boashash, "Notes on the use of the wigner distribution for time frequency signal analysis", IEEE Trans. on Acoust. Speech. and Signal Processing, vol. 26, no. 9, 1987
 R. N. Bracewell, The Fourier Transform and Its Applications, McGraw Hill Book Company, New York, 1978
 E. O. Brigham, The Fast Fourier Transform, Prentice-Hall Inc., Englewood Cliffs, New Jersey, 1974
 
 I. Daubechies, "The wavelet transform, time-frequency localization and signal analysis", IEEE Trans. on Information Theory, vol. 36, no. 5, Sept. 1990
 
 D. Gabor, "Theory of communication", J. Inst. Elect. Eng., vol. 93, no. 3, pp. 429–457, 1946
 
 F. Hlawatsch and G. F. Boudreuax-Bartels, 1992 "Linear and quadratic timefrequency signal representations", IEEE SP Magazine, pp. 21–67
 
 R. K. Young, Wavelet Theory and its Applications, Kluwer Academic Publishers, Dordrecht,1993

Integral transforms
Fourier analysis
Time–frequency analysis